San Hui is one of the MTR Light Rail stops. It is located at ground level at Castle Peak Road next to San Hui Village in Tuen Mun District. It began service on 2 February 1992 and belongs to Zone 2. It serves San Hui Village and Kau Hui San Village.

References

See also
 San Hui

MTR Light Rail stops
Former Kowloon–Canton Railway stations
Tuen Mun District
Railway stations in Hong Kong opened in 1992
1992 establishments in Hong Kong